Ozias Bowen (July 21, 1805 – September 26, 1871) was a Republican politician in the U.S. State of Ohio who was an Ohio Supreme Court Judge 1856–1858.

Biography
Ozias Bowen was born at Augusta, Oneida County, New York. He lived in Fredonia, New York until age 15, when he was moved to Ashtabula County, Ohio. He studied law in Canton, Ohio, was admitted to the bar there, and began practice at Marion, Ohio.

Bowen taught school and was a merchant as well as a lawyer. On February 7, 1838, the Legislature elected him Presiding Judge of the Second Judicial Circuit for seven years, to which he was re-elected. In this capacity, Judge Bowen was most famous for delivering a decision on August 27, 1839 that freed a fugitive slave named Bill Mitchell, sparking a battle between proslavery and anti-slavery forces known as The Marion Riot. 

In 1856, Charles Cleveland Convers resigned from the Ohio Supreme Court due to poor health. Governor Chase appointed Bowen to the judgeship. He was elected later that year with a plurality in a three-way race over Democrat Carrington W. Seal and American Party nominee Samuel Brush to the remainder of the term.

He was a presidential elector for Lincoln/Johnson in 1864. He died September 26, 1871 at Marion Ohio.

Personal life 
Bowen's Marion, Ohio residence is owned by the Marion County Historical Association and operates it as the  Stengel-True Museum.

Bowen married Lydia Baker, daughter of Eber Baker on February 17, 1833, in Marion. She died shortly after the birth of her eighth child. Bowen married Eliza M. McIntire on March 15, 1848 in Marion. She had two children. Following Eliza's death, he later married Emmalie M. Wilson on April 20, 1871, in Branch, Michigan. They had no children.

Judge Bowen's second home in Marion, Ohio is owned by the Marion County Historical Association.  Bowen's first home in Marion on East Center Street is the oldest standing house on its original foundation in the city of Marion.

Notes

References

Ohio lawyers
Justices of the Ohio Supreme Court
Ohio Republicans
People from Marion, Ohio
People from Augusta, New York
1805 births
1871 deaths
1864 United States presidential electors
People from Fredonia, New York
19th-century American judges
19th-century American lawyers